Mersch is a canton in the centre of Luxembourg. It is the only canton, other than Luxembourg, to be entirely surrounded by other cantons, and therefore not to have an international boundary. Its capital is Mersch.

Administrative divisions
Mersch Canton consists of the following ten communes:

 Bissen
 Colmar-Berg
 Fischbach
 Heffingen
 Helperknapp
 Larochette
 Lintgen
 Lorentzweiler
 Mersch
 Nommern

Mergers
 On 1 January 2018 the former communes of Boevange-sur-Attert and Tuntange were merged to create the commune of Helperknapp. The name "Helperknapp" derives from the name of a hill of the same name located within the commune.

Population

References

 
Cantons of Luxembourg